Flixton is a village in the Scarborough district of North Yorkshire, England. Until 1974 the village lay in the historic county boundaries of the East Riding of Yorkshire. There is a public house, the Foxhound Inn.

History
The area was known to have been settled by humans in the Mesolithic era, roughly around 15,000 to 5,000 BP. Evidence of Mesolithic settlers exist at nearby Star Carr, and the post-glacial watercourse of Lake Flixton, which was north of the village. Archaeological excavations in the area have discovered ceremonial mace-heads made from pebble, flints, and ochre crayons believed to be 10,000 years old. During the reign of Æthelstan (924-939), a hospital was built in the settlement "for the preservation of persons travelling that way, that they might not be destroyed by wolves and other wild beasts then abounding in that neighbourhood...." The hospital possessed a chapel and was rebuilt in 1447, though by 1535 it had been abandoned and farmland now occupies the site.

Flixton is mentioned in the Domesday Book as Fleustone; having three villagers, 37 ploughlands, and one church. The name derives from a combination of Old Danish and Old English, Flīks-tũn; literally the town of Flic's people. Originally in the East Riding wapentake of Dickering, it was later transferred into North Yorkshire during the county boundary changes of 1974. The village is on the A1039 road connecting the A64 with A165 road near Filey.

There is one Guest House, Orchard Lodge, which has won national and local awards, and the Foxhound Inn, which also serves as a fish and chip shop. All other amenities, post office, shop and bus service, have been lost in the 2010s.

Folkton & Flixton C.C., the local cricket club, for the villages of Flixton and Folkton, won the national Village Cup at Lord's in 2018.

At the 2011 Census, the population of the village was recorded in that of the entire Folkton Parish, which had 535 residents.

See also
 Star Carr

References

External links

Folkton Parish Council website

Villages in North Yorkshire